Amitabh Mattoo (born 26 June 1962, Srinagar) is one of India's leading thinkers and writers on Modern and Contemporary History, Political science, International relations. He was awarded Padma Shri by the Government of India in 2009. He is a professor at Jawaharlal Nehru University and honorary professor of international relations at the University of Melbourne. Mattoo is a member of the Academic Advisory Board of the German Institute for Global and Area Studies and was recently elected unanimously as its Deputy Chair. He was the founding CEO of the Australia India Institute at the University of Melbourne and served as chairman of the governing board of Miranda House, University of Delhi, the highest-ranked women's college in India, and served as Chair of Kirori Mal College earlier  He has also been a member of the Lancet Commission on Adolescent Health and Wellbeing. In 2002, he was the youngest person to be appointed as vice chancellor of a public university in independent India. Mattoo's advice on policy matters has been sought across political parties and across governments, including by Prime Ministers Atal Behari Vajpayee and Dr Manmohan Singh. Until 19 June 2018, he served as Advisor to the Chief Minister of Jammu and Kashmir, with the status of a Cabinet Minister. Following the abrogation of Article 370 of the Constitution of India, he has offered a political roadmap for securing the future of Jammu and Kashmir. He has been a persistent advocate of multiculturalism and of reconciliation between Kashmiri Pandits and Kashmiri Muslims.

Family, early life and education

A son of the academic and writer Neerja Mattoo and the forester and civil servant Rajendra Kumar Mattoo, Amitabh received his early education at the Burn Hall School in Srinagar and then at the Jawaharlal Nehru University in New Delhi, following which he married Ajita, a member of the 1987 batch of the Indian Railway Accounts Service. He qualified for the Indian Police Service in 1987 and then IAS in 1988 through the combined civil service exam but preferred a career in academics. He went on to earn a DPhil in International Relations from the University of Oxford, writing a history of the campaign for nuclear disarmament. He describes the ten days of youth that he spent in Tihar jail as part of student protests at JNU as a 'life-shaping experience'.

Mattoo comes from a well-known and progressive Kashmiri Pandit family of Srinagar, which never left the valley during the years of conflict. Before the land reforms in Jammu and Kashmir, his family were among the most influential feudal landlords, aristocrats and administrators in the region. Examining the recent social history of his own ethnic group, Mattoo remarks:

Career
Mattoo has been a visiting professor at Stanford University, the University of Notre Dame, and the University of Illinois at Urbana-Champaign. He has been Chairperson of the Centre for International Politics, Organization and Disarmament at Jawaharlal Nehru University as well as Founder Director and CEO of the Australia India Institute, University of Melbourne and a member of the National Knowledge Commission, a high-level advisory group to the Prime Minister of India. He has also been a member of the advisory board of India's National Security Council, a member of the Indian Prime Minister's Task Force on Global Strategic Developments, on the executive committee and governing council of the Pugwash Conferences on Science and World Affairs, and a member of the Indian Prime Minister's High-Level Group on Nuclear Disarmament. He also co-chaired the Knowledge Initiative with the Education Minister of Jammu and Kashmir. The Knowledge Initiative was established by the state government to recommend interventions in schools, colleges and institutions of higher learning to make the education system socially relevant and globally competitive.

Mattoo has published books on India's nuclear policy and India-Pakistan relations and has written on Kashmir. Mattoo has published ten books and more than 100 research articles (including in journals like Survival and Asian Survey). He regularly writes for Indian English-language newspapers such as The Telegraph and The Hindu, and has been a liberally inclined political commentator on national television.

Mattoo became the youngest Vice-Chancellor of the University of Jammu in November 2002 and continued at this position until December 2008. As a patron of the arts, he was responsible for building a world-class auditorium in Jammu University, which also hosts an art gallery and a museum. Leading Indian artists, including the École nationale supérieure des Beaux-Arts-trained Bengali painter Jogen Chowdhury, have donated their work to the gallery. As president of the Jammu and Kashmir chapter of SPIC MACAY, Mattoo was responsible for the university becoming a nationally acclaimed centre of culture.

Mattoo's attempts at conflict resolution and peace-building (combining theory with practice) have been publicly acclaimed. He was a member of the committee, appointed by the Governor of Jammu and Kashmir in 2008, which negotiated the Amarnath land transfer controversy, a series of political events that had led to uprisings in Jammu and Kashmir. On 26 June 2011, Jammu and Kashmir Chief Minister Omar Abdullah made an open offer to Mattoo to return to his home state and 'advise us' in his capacity as a noted political thinker and academic. On 21 August 2015, Mattoo was appointed as Advisor to the Chief Minister of Jammu and Kashmir.

For over a decade, he chaired the Chaophraya Track 2 Dialogue between India and Pakistan, and is regarded as one of the most creative thinkers on conflict resolution and pathways to build sustainable peace in South Asia. Mattoo endorses forgiveness and reconciliation among conflict-embittered South Asian peoples.

On 3 February 2011, in a meeting with India's Education Minister Kapil Sibal, Mattoo declined to be the Founding Vice-Chancellor of the Central University of Jammu – for which he had been selected by a search committee of eminent academics and approved by the President of India – citing personal reasons. Earlier, he was in the shortlist of three for the Vice-Chancellorship of Jawaharlal Nehru University. On 1 March 2011, the University of Melbourne appointed Mattoo as the inaugural director of the Australia India Institute. The chairman of the institute's Board, University of Melbourne Chancellor the Hon. Alex Chernov AO QC (erstwhile Governor of Victoria) announced: "We are delighted to have as Director a person of world-renowned academic and administrative calibre such as Professor Mattoo. He has a wealth of experience in areas concerned with university affairs, government and other institutions." Mattoo also serves as Professor of International Relations in the Faculty of Arts at the University of Melbourne.

Mattoo advocates greater economic and political cooperation between Australia and India. In January 2020, he wrote: "After more than six decades characterised by misperception, lack of trust, neglect, missed opportunities and even hostility, a new chapter in India’s relations with Australia has well and truly begun. Consider this: in 1955, Prime Minister Robert Menzies decided that Australia should not take part in the Bandung Afro-Asian conference. By distancing Australia from the ‘new world’, Menzies (who would later confess that Occidentals did not understand India) alienated Indians, offended Prime Minister Jawaharlal Nehru, and left Australia unsure for decades about its Asian identity. India and Australia should bring this chequered past to a closure, and herald a new united front for the Indo-Pacific."

Awards
Recognizing his contribution to education and public life, the President of India honoured Mattoo on the occasion of the Republic Day (2008) with the Padma Shri, one of India's highest civilian awards. This was the first time a Vice-chancellor in Jammu and Kashmir had been so honoured.

Mattoo was awarded the Qimpro Platinum Standard Award (2008) and was recognised as a 'national statesman' for his work in the field of education along with Anand Mahindra, who was awarded for his leadership in business.

In 2016, Mattoo was awarded a Doctor of Laws (Honoris Causa) degree by the Hindustan Institute of Technology and Science, Tamil Nadu; and in 2018, the Capital Foundation Award for being an 'outstanding educationist'.

Mattoo has also received several awards for his contribution to India-Australia relations, including the Asoka Award.

References

1962 births
Kashmiri people
University of Notre Dame faculty
University of Illinois Urbana-Champaign faculty
Stanford University faculty
Academic staff of Jawaharlal Nehru University
Living people
Jawaharlal Nehru University alumni
Alumni of the University of Oxford
Recipients of the Padma Shri in literature & education
People from Srinagar
Indian foreign policy writers
Scholars of Indian foreign policy
Scholars from Jammu and Kashmir
University of Jammu
Kashmiri Pandits
Indian people of Kashmiri descent